Stanisław Roman Lewandowski (1859–1940) was a Polish sculptor.

References

1859 births
1940 deaths
Polish sculptors
Polish male sculptors
20th-century sculptors
19th-century sculptors